The British Railways standard class 2 2-6-2T was a class of steam locomotive, one of the standard classes of the 1950s.

Design and construction 
The class was designed at Derby Works and introduced in 1953. The design derived from the LMS Ivatt Class 2 2-6-2T which BR had built after nationalisation. Modifications were made to the Ivatt design including a reduced cab to reduce the loading gauge and some standard fittings. BR classified them 2MT, emphasising a mixed-traffic role.

As most services which required 2MT 2-6-2Ts were already served by the 130 Ivatt engines, B.R. only ordered 30 engines, which eliminated pre-grouping steam locomotives as much as possible on local services.

The first 20 engines were outshopped at Crewe Works, and intended for use on ex-London Midland and Scottish Railway routes, then known as the London Midland Region.
The second batch, this time built at Darlington Works, and were also the final steam locomotives built at Darlington were numbered 84020–84029, and intended for Southern Region lines.

Liveries 
Only two liveries were carried by the 2MTs- British Railway lined black with the earlier and later emblems. Although all locomotives received the latter, only 84000–84019 received the early emblem as the Darlington built locomotives were constructed in 1957, following the 1956 changeover to the late crest.

Service 

The LMR locomotives were used on push-pull routes, and were often allocated alongside the Ivatt 2MT 2-6-2T engines with which they shared most of their origins. Numbers 84021–84029, the Southern Region locomotives were all allocated to the Eastern Section depot at Ashford for use on the lines over Romney Marsh and local trains on the Margate via Canterbury West route. Most were transferred away to the North Eastern Region in the early 1960s following electrification, but several locomotives (including some of the LMR allocation) were re-allocated to Eastleigh in 1965 for possible use on the Isle of Wight, replacing life-expired LSWR O2 class  engines, which were all over 70 years old by then. However, this plan did not cover a coaching stock replacement, and thus the locomotives were ultimately scrapped.

Preservation 
None of the class survived the cutter's torch, although their size and configuration would have made them an ideal choice for use on heritage railways. However, four BR Standard Class 2 2-6-0 locomotives – the tender-equipped equivalent – did survive, and one of these, 78059, is being rebuilt into 2-6-2T "84030". This takes the next number in the original series. 78059 was chosen primarily because it lost its tender, one of several sold for use elsewhere while at Woodham Brothers scrapyard, Barry. Further reasons cited by the Bluebell Railway, where 78059 is based, are the suitability of the locomotive class for the railway's service trains, and because the tender version of the class was never allocated to the Southern Region, and hence the tank version (which was allocated there) is far more appropriate for the Bluebell's Southern Region location. As of 2013, 78059 was considered to no longer exist, as the fitting of the hind engine frame extensions have turned it into 84030.

References

External links 

 Class BR2/2 Details at Rail UK
 Bluebell page for "84030"

2 2-6-2T 
2-6-2T locomotives
Railway locomotives introduced in 1953
Scrapped locomotives
Standard gauge steam locomotives of Great Britain